Christopher Neil (born 1948) is an Irish-born British record producer, songwriter, singer, and actor.

He has produced records for A-ha, Amazulu, Bonnie Tyler, Celine Dion, Cher, Dollar, Edyta Górniak, Gerry Rafferty, Jennifer Rush, José Carreras, Leo Sayer, Marillion, Mike + The Mechanics, Morten Harket, Paul Carrack, Paul Young, Rod Stewart, Shakin' Stevens, Sheena Easton, the Moody Blues, and Toyah Willcox.

In 1973, his song "Help It Along" finished third in the BBC's annual A Song for Europe contest, performed by Cliff Richard. The track was a hit single later in the year for Cliff and the title of his 1974 live album.

Neil started in the mid-sixties as a singer with Manchester group the Chuckles. In 1972 he released a solo album Where I Belong on RAK Records.

He worked as an actor during the 1970s playing Jesus in Jesus Christ Superstar and Ginger in Leaping Ginger at the Royal Exchange Theatre Manchester before working full-time as a record producer. His film roles included The Sex Thief (1973), Eskimo Nell (1975), and Three for All (1975), and in 1976 he starred in the British TV series Rock Follies. In 1977 and 1978 he starred in two of the three 'Adventures of...' British sex comedy films: Adventures of a Private Eye and the final film in the trilogy, Adventures of a Plumber's Mate. In addition to taking the lead role, he wrote and sang the theme songs to the two films. From 1976, Neil was the host of the BBC children's programme You and Me.

Discography

Hit singles as producer
Christopher Neil has produced many songs that reached the top 10 of the UK Singles Chart or the US Billboard Hot 100:

See also
 :Category:Albums produced by Christopher Neil

References

External links
 
 

Irish record producers
Irish songwriters
Irish male singers
Irish male stage actors
Irish male film actors
20th-century Irish male actors
Irish emigrants to the United Kingdom
British record producers
British songwriters
British male singers
British male stage actors
British male film actors
British soft rock musicians
1948 births
Living people
Rak Records artists
Place of birth missing (living people)